Bohemia competed at the 1906 Intercalated Games in Athens, Greece. 13 athletes, all men, competed in 22 events in 6 sports.

Medalists

Athletics

Track

Field

Fencing

Gymnastics

Shooting

Tennis

Although Zdenek Žemla was beaten in the second round records show he won the bronze medal

Wrestling

Greco-Roman

References

Nations at the 1906 Intercalated Games
1906
1906 in Austria-Hungary
Intercalated Games